Gabriel Salguero is an Argentinian former footballer who played in the Ecuadorian Serie A, Canadian Professional Soccer League, and the Primera B Metropolitana.

Playing career 
Salguero played with Deportivo Cuenca of the Ecuadorian Serie A in 2001. On July 20, 2002 he signed a contract with North York Astros of the Canadian Professional Soccer League. In his debut season with North York he reached the CPSL Championship where they faced the Ottawa Wizards, but lost the match by a score of 2–0. In total he played four seasons with North York. In 2006, he signed with Defensores de Belgrano of the Primera B Metropolitana, where he featured in 11 matches.

External links 

Living people
Argentine footballers
C.D. Cuenca footballers
North York Astros players
Defensores de Belgrano footballers
Canadian Soccer League (1998–present) players
Primera B Metropolitana players
Association football defenders
1985 births
Sportspeople from Córdoba Province, Argentina